A penumbral lunar eclipse took place on Sunday, October 8, 1995, the second of two lunar eclipses in 1995, the first was a partial lunar eclipse on Saturday, April 15.

Visibility

Related eclipses

Eclipses of 1995 
 A partial lunar eclipse on April 15.
 An annular solar eclipse on April 29.
 A penumbral lunar eclipse on October 8.
 A total solar eclipse on October 24.

Lunar year series 

This is the first of four lunar year eclipses at the descending node of the moon's orbit.

Saros series 
It was part of Saros series 117.

Half-Saros cycle
A lunar eclipse will be preceded and followed by solar eclipses by 9 years and 5.5 days (a half saros). This lunar eclipse is related to two solar eclipses of Solar Saros 124.

Tritos series 
 Preceded: Lunar eclipse of November 8, 1984
 Followed: Lunar eclipse of September 7, 2006

Tzolkinex 
 Preceded: Lunar eclipse of August 27, 1988
 Followed: Lunar eclipse of November 20, 2002

See also 
List of lunar eclipses
List of 20th-century lunar eclipses

References

External links 
 Saros cycle 117
 

1995-10
1995 in science
October 1995 events